A Cappella Live is an album by dub poet Linton Kwesi Johnson released in 1996 on the LKJ Records label. LKJ performs all the tracks, recorded at various venues in 1993 and 1994, without any accompaniment.

Track listing

Recording
1, 2, 5-7 recorded Beurschouwburg, Brussels, 1993
3, 4 recorded Dal Segno, Nijmegen, 1993
8, 13, 14 recorded Ronnie Scott's Jazz Club, Soho, London, 1994
9, 10, 12, 14 recorded St. Mark's Church, Piccadilly, London, 1993.

Personnel
Linton Kwesi Johnson – vocals

References 

Linton Kwesi Johnson albums
Dub albums
1996 live albums
A cappella albums